Sara Alpysovna Nazarbayeva (née Konakayeva (Qonaqaeva, Қонақаева); born 12 February 1941) served as the First Lady of Kazakhstan and is the wife of President Nursultan Nazarbayev. She married Nursultan in 1962 after her graduation. They have three daughters — Dariga, Dinara and Aliya — and six grandchildren and a great granddaughter.

For her work with children she was awarded the Ihsan Dogramaci Family Health Foundation Prize by the World Health Organization in 1997 and the International Unity Prize.

References

1941 births
Living people
First ladies of Kazakhstan
Nursultan Nazarbayev family
Ihsan Doğramacı Family Health Foundation Prize laureates